Couroupita guianensis, known by a variety of common names including cannonball tree, is a deciduous tree in the flowering plant family Lecythidaceae. It is native to the tropical forests of Central and South America, and it is cultivated in many other tropical areas throughout the world because of its beautiful, fragrant flowers and large, interesting fruits. Fruits are brownish grey. There are potential medicinal uses for many parts of Couroupita guianensis, and the tree has cultural and religious significance in India. In Sri Lanka, the cannonball tree has been widely misidentified as Sal, after its introduction to the island by the British in 1881, and has been included as a common item in Buddhist temples as a result.

Description

Flowers
Some trees flower profusely until the entire trunk is covered with racemes. One tree can hold as many as 1000 flowers per day. The flowers are strongly scented, and are especially fragrant at night and in the early morning. There are two areas of stamens: a ring of stamens at the center, and an arrangement of stamens that have been modified into a hood.

Fruits
Smaller fruits may contain about 65 seeds, while large ones can hold as many as 550. One tree can bear 150 fruits. The fruits take up to a year to mature in most areas, sometimes as long as 18 months. The fruit flesh is white and turns blue upon oxidation, a reaction with air.

Scientific name
The tree was named Couroupita guianensis by the French botanist Jean Baptiste Christophore Fusée Aublet in 1775.

The Latin specific epithet guianensis means "of the Guianas" (an area of north eastern South America).

Pollination
Although the flowers lack nectar, they are very attractive to bees, which come for the pollen. The flowers produce two types of pollen: fertile pollen from the ring stamens, and sterile pollen from the hood structure. The pollinators must work their way between the two areas of stamens as they gather the pollen. The carpenter bee Xylocopa brasilianorum is a common pollinator of cultivated trees in Rio de Janeiro, just outside the tree's native range. Other carpenter bees such as Xylocopa frontalis, as well as wasps, flower flies, and bumblebees, are also known to visit the flowers.

Dispersal
The seeds are dispersed by animals that feed on the fruits. When the fruits fall to the ground, the hard, woody shell usually cracks open, exposing the pulp and seeds. Fruits that remain whole may be broken open by animals such as peccaries. Many animals feed on the pulp and seeds, including peccaries, the paca, and domestic chickens and pigs. The seeds are covered with trichomes which may protect them as they pass through the animals' digestive systems.

Human uses
Couroupita guianensis is planted as an ornamental for its showy, scented flowers, and as a botanical specimen for its interesting fruit.

The fruit is edible, but is not usually eaten by people because, in contrast to its intensely fragrant flowers, it can have an unpleasant smell. It is fed to livestock such as pigs and domestic fowl.

Parts of the plant have been used in traditional medicine. It has been used to treat hypertension, tumors, pain, and inflammation, the common cold, stomachache, skin conditions and wounds, malaria, and toothache, although data on its efficacy are lacking.

Cultural significance
In India, the tree is sacred to Hindus, who believe its hooded flowers look like the nāga under which the white stigma looks like a Lingam, and hence, it is grown at Shiva temples.  The cannonball tree has since then been planted at Buddhist and Hindu religious sites in Asia in the belief that it is the tree of sacred scriptures. In Sri Lanka, Thailand and other Theravada Buddhist countries it has been planted at Buddhist monasteries and other religious sites.

Gallery

References

External links

Lecythidaceae
Trees of Cuba
Trees of Costa Rica
Trees of Panama
Trees of French Guiana
Trees of Guyana
Trees of Suriname
Trees of Venezuela
Trees of Brazil
Trees of Colombia
Trees of Ecuador
Trees of Peru
Least concern plants
Plants described in 1775
Medicinal plants